The Lovers! is a 1973 British comedy film based on the 1970-71 Granada Television sitcom The Lovers. It follows the courtship of two young people from Manchester, England, Geoffrey Scrimshaw (Richard Beckinsale) and Beryl Battersby (Paula Wilcox).

Plot
In 1972 Manchester, three girls are window shopping at the George Best Boutique. Three boys stand opposite them and decide which girl they want to take out. Geoffrey Scrimshaw unwittingly ends up with Beryl Battersby, as he gets last choice. A slow, mutual admiration begins between the two of them. Their parents try to use trendy terms but are mocked because they are a decade behind. When Geoffrey is with his male friends, they boast about non-existent conquests.

The young couple have differing opinions on the permissive society: Geoffrey wants to be a part of it, but Beryl wants to wait until marriage.

On his first meeting with her mother, they sit quietly in the living room, drinking tea and eating sardine sandwiches. They cuddle in front of the electric fire after a game of Scrabble. It is going too slowly and they split up.

On his way to meet his parents, to watch Fiddler on the Roof for his mother's birthday, Geoffrey meets Veronica and goes off with her instead. They go to a strip bar and Veronica asks him back to her flat. However, when Veronica goes out of the room, her little brother Jeremy appears. The young boy gives Geoffrey a very technical description of "how to make a baby."

Beryl and Geoffrey meet again at a house party and try to ignore each other. Both try to be "trendy" in their chat up techniques. On the stairs, Edith expounds the values of Women's Lib. Smoking a joint, she takes off her bra and tells Geoffrey to burn it. Beryl storms off and goes to help wash the dishes in the kitchen with Geoffrey's nerdy friend.

Beryl phones him to say she does not want to ever see him again and that she will be at the school jumble sale the next day. He shows up and invites her to a football match to watch Huddersfield play. The relationship still fails to gel. They go the rooftop of Hotel Piccadilly and discuss communication and happiness. They decide they don't like each other.

Meanwhile, Sandra is pregnant and planning to get married. Beryl is seated next to Geoffrey at the reception meal. Splitting up brings them closer together. He discusses going to a "match" and she wrongly assumes he is going to a football match, but it is off-season (he meant cricket). He tracks her down to the empty football stadium and they sit and discuss relationships. Time jumps to them sitting in the same seats in a crowded stadium, with Beryl looking adoringly at him.

The picture freezes and the caption "Not really the End" appears.

Cast
Richard Beckinsale as Geoffrey Scrimshaw
Paula Wilcox as Beryl Battersby
Susan Littler as Sandra
Rosalind Ayres as Veronica
Anthony Naylor as Neville
Nikolas Simmonds as Roland
John Comer as Geoffrey's father
Stella Moray as Geoffrey's mother
Joan Scott as Beryl's mum
Pamela Moiseiwitch as Enid
Bruce Watt as Jeremy
Paul Greenwood as Trainee Manager (Party)
Bernard Latham as "Handsome" (Party)
Karen Ford as Foreign Girl (Party)
James Snell as Doctor
Mary Henry as Woman  (Jumble Sale)
Serena as Stripper
Maggie Flint as Bookstall Manageress 
Ian Gray as Bookstall Assistant

Production

Filming
The movie was filmed in 1972 and featured views of various locations in Manchester of the time, including George Best's "Edwardia" boutique and Manchester United's Old Trafford football stadium. The scenes inside the railway station where Geoffrey and Beryl meet were filmed at Windsor & Eton Central railway station. The film premiered at the Odeon Cinema, Manchester on 14 May 1973.

Music
The theme song, Love and Rainy Weather, sung by Tony Christie and written by Mitch Murray and Peter Callander, was released as a single by MCA in 1973.

Home media
In 2013, Network released a Region 2 DVD of the film, later in a 4-DVD package "British Film Comedy — The 70s" with Sunstruck starring Harry Secombe, The House in Nightmare Park and The Best of Benny Hill.

References

External links

 

1973 films
British romantic comedy films
Films based on television series
Films set in the 1970s
Films set in Manchester
1973 romantic comedy films
Films shot in Greater Manchester
Films directed by Herbert Wise
Films scored by Carl Davis
1970s English-language films
1970s British films